Stygotantulus is a genus of crustacean with the sole species Stygotantulus stocki. It lives as an ectoparasite on harpacticoid copepods of the families Tisbidae and Canuellidae. The specific name stocki commemorates Jan Hendrik Stock, a Dutch carcinologist. Another contender for the world's smallest arthropod is  Tantulacus dieteri,  with a total body length of only .

References 

Maxillopoda
Parasitic crustaceans
Ectoparasites
Monotypic crustacean genera